Rabbi Ephraim Ferdinand Einhorn (Pinyin: Ài Ēnhóng, 12 September 1918 – 15 September 2021) was a British Orthodox rabbi and one of two rabbis who lived in Taiwan. Rabbi Einhorn was affiliated with the Taiwan Jewish Community.

Early years
Einhorn was born in Vienna, Austria. He moved to the United Kingdom at age 14 and later to the United States. Einhorn's parents were killed in the Sachsenhausen concentration camp.

Synagogue services in Taiwan
Einhorn arrived in Taiwan in January 1975 from Kuwait
and started administering Jewish prayer services five years later.  Einhorn operated a Synagogue service with the Taiwan Jewish Community.  Although Jews in Taiwan never had a physical synagogue built (unlike fellow communities such as China, Hong Kong, and Singapore), the first temporary synagogue was created in the 1950s at the United States military chapel when U.S. soldiers were stationed there.  After the breakdown in Republic of China–United States relations and the Taiwan Relations Act passed, prayer services were moved to the President Hotel, which no longer exists, and then for many years at the Landis (formerly Ritz) Hotel.
The Taiwan Jewish Community services are now held in a dedicated space funded by the community.

Other career highlights
Along with religious duties, Einhorn helped to achieve and promote diplomatic relations between the Taiwanese government and the Eastern and Central Europe countries such as the Czech Republic, Hungary, Latvia, Lithuania, Poland and Romania as well as North Macedonia and Ukraine.
He was also a former chairman of the Republicans Abroad Taiwan.

In 2009 the Austrian government awarded him the Grand Decoration of Honour for Services to the Republic of Austria.

Personal life
He married Ruth Weinberg in 1953, and they had two daughters, Daphna and Sharone.

Einhorn died in Taipei on 15 September 2021, three days after his 103rd birthday.

See also
 History of the Jews in Taiwan

References

External links 
 
 Neil Rubin, A Taiwanese Shabbat, Baltimore Jewish Times, 5 May 2007.
 Tsao Yu-fan and Ruth Wang, Taiwan hoping for direct flights with Israel, Central News Agency (Republic of China), 7 July 2008.
 Taiwan opposition pulls Hitler ad, BBC News Online, 12 March 2004.
 The Virtual Jewish History Tour: Taiwan, Jewish Virtual Library, 13 September 2006.
 Tea break with Taipei's only Rabbi , eRenlai'', 5 July 2010.
Taiwan Jewish Community

1918 births
2021 deaths
20th-century rabbis
British Orthodox rabbis
Austrian Orthodox Jews
Taiwanese rabbis
British expatriates in Taiwan
British people of Austrian-Jewish descent
Austrian emigrants to the United Kingdom
Recipients of the Grand Decoration for Services to the Republic of Austria
Austrian centenarians
British centenarians
British expatriates in the United States
British expatriates in Kuwait
Men centenarians
Religious leaders in China